A penumbral lunar eclipse will take place on 18 July 2027. The Moon will barely clip the edge of the Earth's penumbral shadow, and the eclipse will be impossible to see in practice. The event is listed as a miss by some sources.

Visibility 
Insofar as it is visible at all, it will be visible over Asia and Australia.

Related lunar eclipses

Eclipses in 2027
 An annular solar eclipse on 6 February.
 A penumbral lunar eclipse on 20 February.
 A penumbral lunar eclipse on 18 July.
 A total solar eclipse on 2 August.
 A penumbral lunar eclipse on 17 August.

Lunar year series

Saros series 

This eclipse is a member of Saros series 110. The previous event occurred on July 7, 2009. This is the last lunar eclipse of this series.

Half-Saros cycle
A lunar eclipse will be preceded and followed by solar eclipses by 9 years and 5.5 days (a half saros). This lunar eclipse is related to two partial solar eclipses of Solar Saros 117.

See also 
List of lunar eclipses and List of 21st-century lunar eclipses
August 2016 lunar eclipse

Notes

External links 
 

2027-07
2027-07
2027 in science